Capital Recordings is a small record label formed in November 2001 based in Wellington, New Zealand. Their aim is to help musicians recording in their bedrooms, apartments and beach houses around Wellington and New Zealand reach a wider audience. They have released albums for such New Zealand artists as; Die! Die! Die!, The Phoenix Foundation, The Fanatics, STYLUS77 and many more.

External links
 Official Capital Recordings Website

New Zealand record labels
IFPI members